Stillington could be

Stillington, County Durham, England
Stillington, North Yorkshire, England
Robert Stillington, Bishop of Bath and Wells and Lord Chancellor of England.